Kintore (Pintupi: Walungurru) is a remote settlement in the Kintore Range of the Northern Territory of Australia about  west of Alice Springs and  from the border with Western Australia. It is also known as Walungurru, Walangkura, and Walangura.

History
The Kintore Range was named by William Tietkens during his expedition of 1889 after the Governor of South Australia, Algernon Keith-Falconer, 9th Earl of Kintore.

In 1979 and 1980 satisfactory water was found in four bores sunk at and near the Kintore Range. In mid-1981 an outstation (homeland) was established there and developed as a resource centre for camps elsewhere in the region, allowing the reoccupation of at least some of the Pintupi country.

Demographics
At the 2016 census, Kintore had a population of 410, of which 376 (91.9 per cent) identified themselves as Aboriginal Australians.

The main languages spoken are Pintupi and  Luritja. In Pintupi, the majority language of the community, Kintore is known as Walungurru.

Governance
Kintore is overseen by the MacDonnell Regional Council, based in Alice Springs.

The town is in the territory electorate of Gwoja and the federal electorate of Lingiari.

Facilities
The community has a Northern Territory Government-funded primary school, an independent store trading as Puli Kutjarra (meaning Two Rocks/mountains in Pintupi language),  an airstrip,  an independent health clinic called Pintupi Homelands Health Service, a women's centre called Ngintaka Women's Centre, haemodialysis at The Purple House run by Western Desert Dialysis, a high school run by Yirara College,

The local Australian rules football team is the Kintore Hawks.

Art centre
There is an arts centre run by Papunya Tula Artists Pty Ltd.

Kintore is a major centre for the Western Desert art movement which began at the community of Papunya. These people traditionally passed on significant Dreamtime stories by way of art using sand, rock and local plants. Nowadays such paintings are done on canvas and have gained worldwide popularity. A number of members of the famous Aboriginal art company Papunya Tula] live at Kintore, among them the deceased artist Ningura Napurrula.

In popular culture
Kintore is mentioned in the Midnight Oil song "Beds are Burning": "Four wheels scare the cockatoos/From Kintore east to Yuendumu".

Footnotes

References

Populated places established in 1981
Towns in the Northern Territory
Aboriginal communities in the Northern Territory